Excess Baggage is a 1933 British comedy film directed by Redd Davis and starring Claud Allister, Frank Pettingell, Sydney Fairbrother, Rene Ray, Gerald Rawlinson and Viola Compton. Its plot concerns a British army Colonel mistakenly who thinks he has killed his superior officer while hunting down a ghost. It was made at Twickenham Studios in west London as a quota quickie for distribution as a second feature by RKO Pictures.

Cast
 Claud Allister as Colonel Murgatroyd
 Frank Pettingell as Major General Booster
 Sydney Fairbrother as Miss Toop
 Rene Ray as Angela Murgatroyd
 Gerald Rawlinson as Clive Worthington
 Viola Compton as Martha Murgatroyd
 O. B. Clarence as Lord Grebe
 Maud Gill as Duchess of Dillwater
 Finlay Currie as Inspector Toucan

References

Bibliography
 Chibnall, Steve. Quota Quickies: The British of the British 'B' Film. British Film Institute, 2007.

External links

1933 films
Films directed by Redd Davis
1933 comedy films
British comedy films
Films shot at Twickenham Film Studios
British black-and-white films
Quota quickies
1930s English-language films
1930s British films